Florisbad is a health resort 45 km northwest of Bloemfontein and 47 km south-west of Brandfort, near the Haagenstad salt-pan. Named after Floris Venter who opened up the mineral spring. Florisbad archaeological and paleontological site is now a tourist attraction.

References

Populated places in the Masilonyana Local Municipality